Ron Watson nicknamed "Bluey" was an Australian professional rugby league footballer who played in the 1950s and coached in the 1970s.

Playing career
Watson began his career with Western Suburbs in 1950.  In 1952, Watson was a member of the Western Suburbs side which claimed their fourth and final premiership defeating South Sydney 22-10 in the grand final.  Watson played for three more seasons before retiring as a player in 1956.

Coaching career
Watson began his coaching career in 1970 for Western Suburbs taking over from Noel Kelly.  Watson's coaching career was not as successful as his playing career only winning ten matches in two seasons and in his final year finishing with the wooden spoon.

References

Australian rugby league coaches
Australian rugby league players
Rugby league players from Sydney
Rugby league second-rows
Western Suburbs Magpies coaches
Western Suburbs Magpies players
1929 births
2004 deaths